Shankar Gobinda Choudhury Stadiumis the district stadium of, Natore, Bangladesh. The stadium is located by the Children's Park of Natore municipality. Stadium is a multi-purpose venue, mainly used for national day parade, district level football completions.

Hosted events

 The zonal host of 4th National Football Championship from June 25 to July 1 in 2004.
 The zonal host of 5th National Football Championship from September 15–26 in 2005.

See also
Stadiums in Bangladesh
List of cricket grounds in Bangladesh
Sheikh Kamal Stadium, Nilphamari

References

Cricket grounds in Bangladesh
Football venues in Bangladesh